Aapo Kustaa Perko (20 December 1924 – 13 December 2021) was a Finnish shot putter who competed in the 1952 Summer Olympics. Perko died on 13 December 2021, at the age of 97.

References

1924 births
2021 deaths
Athletes (track and field) at the 1952 Summer Olympics
Finnish male shot putters
Olympic athletes of Finland